Slat is an unincorporated community in Wayne County, Kentucky, United States.  Its post office  is closed.

The origin of the name "Slat" is obscure.

References

Unincorporated communities in Wayne County, Kentucky
Unincorporated communities in Kentucky